2018 Nepal Basketball League also known as Kwiks Basketball League for sponsorship reasons, was the first season of Nepal Basketball League. The league began on 17 February 2018 and ended on 31 March 2018.

Golden Gate International College were crowned the first champions after beating Nepal Army Club 97-96 in the final.

Teams

Regular season

League table 

 Top 4 teams qualified for the playoffs

Results

Playoffs

Semi-finals

Third place

Final

Statistics

Individual statistic leaders

See also 
 Nepal national basketball team
 2019 Nepal Basketball League season

References 

Kwiks Basketball League
Kwiks Basketball League
Basketball in Nepal